Torre Gaia is a station of Line C of the Rome Metro. It is located along the Via Casilina and serves the Roman districts Torre Gaia and Tor Bella Monaca. The former train station of the Rome–Pantano railway line closed in 2008; the new Metro station, which opened on 9 November 2014, has been built nearby.

External links

Rome Metro Line C stations
Railway stations opened in 2014
2014 establishments in Italy
Railway stations in Italy opened in the 21st century